Ben McNeill is an Australian film producer of feature and documentary films, including the 2018 organ transplant feature documentary Dying to Live (2018), which follows those awaiting an organ on the organ transplant list, and which was shortlisted for a 2018 AACTA Award.

McNeill has collaborated with filmmaker Mark Lewis on the projects Cane Toads: The Conquest (2010) and The Standard of Perfection series specials, and Australian producer Trish Lake on the theatrical feature documentary Frackman and Australian-Canadian drama co-production Early Winter.

McNeill is the managing director of production company Intrinsic Story and a director of Foursome Entertainment and is based in Brisbane, Australia.

He teaches at Bond University.

Feature films 
 Dying to Live (2018)

References

External links
 

Living people
Australian film producers
Australian documentary film producers
People from Brisbane
Year of birth missing (living people)